Utricularia terrae-reginae is a small, probably annual carnivorous plant that belongs to the genus Utricularia. U. terrae-reginae is endemic to the Cape York Peninsula of Queensland, Australia, where it is only known from two locations. It grows as a terrestrial plant in sedge flats in shallow water or in open Melaleuca woodland at lower altitudes. It was originally described and published by Peter Taylor in 1986.

See also 
 List of Utricularia species

References 

Carnivorous plants of Australia
Flora of Queensland
Plants described in 1986
Lamiales of Australia
terrae-reginae